James Xavier McLanahan (May 17, 1809December 16, 1861) was a Democratic member of the U.S. House of Representatives for Pennsylvania's 16th congressional district from 1849 to 1853.

Early life and education
McLanahan was born near Greencastle, Pennsylvania to William and Mary (Gregg) McLanahan.  He was the grandson of Pennsylvania Senator Andrew Gregg and second cousin to Pennsylvania Governor Andrew Gregg Curtin.  He graduated from Dickinson College in Carlisle, Pennsylvania, in 1827.  He studied law under George Chambers who went on to become a Congressman and Pennsylvania Supreme Court justice.  He was admitted to the bar in 1837 and commenced practice in Chambersburg, Pennsylvania.

Career
He served as a member of the Pennsylvania State Senate for the 14th district from 1841 to 1842 and for the 18th district from 1843 to 1844.

McLanahan was elected as a Democrat to the Thirty-first and Thirty-second Congresses.  He was the chairman of the United States House Committee on the Judiciary during the Thirty-second Congress.  He was not a candidate for renomination in 1852.  He resumed the practice of law and died in New York City in 1861.  Interment in First Presbyterian Church Cemetery in Chambersburg, Pennsylvania.

Footnotes

Sources

The Political Graveyard

|-

1809 births
1861 deaths
19th-century American lawyers
19th-century American politicians
American Presbyterians
Burials in Pennsylvania
Dickinson College alumni
Pennsylvania lawyers
Democratic Party members of the United States House of Representatives from Pennsylvania
Democratic Party Pennsylvania state senators
People from Chambersburg, Pennsylvania